The Eugenides Foundation is Greek private educational foundation. It was established in 1956 in Athens, Greece implementing the will of the late Greek benefactor Eugenios Eugenidis, who died in April 1954.

The activity of the foundation, in accordance with its articles of association, is to contribute to the scientific and technological education of young people in Greece. The foundation is administered by a committee of three persons, which is participated by each professor which is elected as a rector of the National Technical University of Athens (NTUA) until the end of his term as a rector. For its multifaceted contribution to Greek society, Eugenides Foundation was honored in December 1965 with the gold medal of the Academy of Athens.

Activities
The activities and establishments of the Foundation include:
a scholarship program granting 20 scholarships annually
a scientific and technical library,
a museum of science and technology,
publishing of scientific and technical books, with over 45.000.000 copies of books published to date,
a digital computerized planetarium, of dome diameter 25 m and a total surface of 950 m2, one of the best equipped in the world.
lecture halls and auditoriums.

References

External links
Official website

Foundations based in Greece
Planetaria in Greece
Science museums in Greece
Museums in Athens